Jarosław "Jarek" Hampel (born 17 April 1982 in Łódź, Poland) is a motorcycle speedway rider from Poland. He is a six times World Cup winner.

Career
He received his speedway license in 1998 with the Polish team Polonia Piła, although he first started racing on a mini-track in Pawłowice, close to the city of Leszno.

In 1999, he won a bronze medal at the Individual U-19 European Championship as well as a bronze medal at the Individual U-21 World Championship in 2000 and a gold medal in 2003.

He started in the Speedway Grand Prix in 2000, and became a regular starter from 2004. In 2005 he won the Speedway World Cup with Poland, together with Tomasz Gollob, Piotr Protasiewicz, Grzegorz Walasek and Rune Holta; beating Sweden, Denmark and Great Britain in the final held at the Olympic Stadium in Wrocław, Poland. As well as 2005 he has since won the world cup another three times in 2007, 2009 & 2010 taking his number of world cup gold medals to four. In 2000, he began his British leagues career when he joined Ipswich Witches.

Hampel won two silver medals at the Individual Polish Championships in 2000 and 2004, as well as three medals at the Junior Individual Polish Championships ( Gold in 2001, Silver in 2002, Bronze in 2000).

In 2010 and 2013, he became the World Championship runner-up, winning silver medals in the Speedway World Championships (Grand Prix Series), and in 2011, he won the bronze medal. He became the Polish Champion in 2011, after winning the Polish Individual Speedway Championship.

He later won six Speedway World Cups with Poland during an eight year period. The wins came in 2005, 2007, 2009, 2010, 2011 and 2013.

In 2022, he helped Lublin win the 2022 Ekstraliga.

Awards
For his sport achievements, he received: 
 Bronze Cross of Merit in 2005; 
 Golden Cross of Merit in 2007.

Speedway Grand Prix results

References

1982 births
Living people
Polish speedway riders
Speedway World Cup champions
Ipswich Witches riders
Sportspeople from Łódź